A total lunar eclipse took place on Saturday, May 4, 1985, the first of two total lunar eclipses in 1985, the second being on October 28, 1985.

This lunar eclipse is first of a tetrad, four total lunar eclipses in series. The last series was in 1967 and 1968, starting with an April 1967 lunar eclipse, while the next was in 2003 and 2004, starting with a May 2003 lunar eclipse.

Visibility 
It is seen rising over the whole of Africa, Middle East, Europe and  Asia. The eclipse was sighted over the Philippines at night. The second also followed on October 28, 1985.

Related eclipses

Eclipses of 1985 
 A total lunar eclipse on May 4.
 A partial solar eclipse on May 19.
 A total lunar eclipse on October 28.
 A total solar eclipse on November 12.

Lunar year series

Metonic series 

This eclipse is the second of four Metonic cycle lunar eclipses on the same date, May 4–5, each separated by 19 years:

Saros series 

It is a member of Saros cycle 121.

Half-Saros cycle
A lunar eclipse will be preceded and followed by solar eclipses by 9 years and 5.5 days (a half saros). This lunar eclipse is related to two annular solar eclipses of Solar Saros 128.

See also 
List of lunar eclipses
List of 20th-century lunar eclipses

Notes

External links 
 

1985-05
1985 in science
May 1985 events